I Married a Witch is a 1942 American fantasy romantic comedy film, directed by René Clair, and starring Veronica Lake as a witch whose plan for revenge goes comically awry, with Fredric March as her foil.  The film also features Robert Benchley, Susan Hayward and Cecil Kellaway.  The screenplay by Robert Pirosh and Marc Connelly and uncredited other writers, including Dalton Trumbo, is based on the 1941 novel The Passionate Witch by Thorne Smith, who died before he could finish it; it was completed by Norman H. Matson.

Plot
Two witches in colonial Salem, Jennifer and her father Daniel, are burned at the stake after being denounced by Puritan Jonathan Wooley. Their ashes were buried beneath a tree to imprison their evil spirits. In revenge, Jennifer curses Wooley and all his male descendants, dooming them always to marry the wrong woman.

Centuries pass. Generation after generation, Wooley men marry cruel, shrewish women. Finally, in 1942, lightning splits the tree, freeing the spirits of Jennifer and Daniel. They discover Wallace Wooley, living nearby and running for governor, on the eve of marrying the ambitious and spoiled Estelle Masterson, whose father J.B. just happens to be Wooley's chief political backer.

Initially, Jennifer and Daniel manifest themselves as white vertical smoky "trails", occasionally hiding in empty, or sometimes not-so-empty, bottles of alcohol.  Jennifer persuades Daniel to create a human body for her so she can torment Wallace. Daniel needs a fire to perform the spell, so he burns down a building, appropriately enough, the Pilgrim Hotel. This serves dual purposes, as Jennifer uses it to get the passing Wallace to rescue her from the flames.

Jennifer tries hard to seduce Wallace without magic. Even though he is strongly attracted to her, he refuses to put off his marriage. She concocts a love potion, but her scheme goes awry when a painting falls on her. Wallace revives her by giving her the drink she had intended for him.

Daniel conjures himself a body. Then he and Jennifer crash the wedding, though they are at cross purposes. Daniel hates all Wooleys and tries to prevent his daughter from helping one of them. His attempts at interference land him in jail, too drunk to remember the spell to turn Wallace into a frog. Meanwhile, Estelle finds the couple embracing and the wedding is called off. Outraged, J.B. promises to denounce the candidate in all his newspapers. Wallace finally admits that he loves Jennifer, and they elope.

Jennifer then works overtime with her witchcraft to rescue Wallace's political career. She conjures up little clouds of brainwashing white smoke that "convince" every voter to support Wallace, and he is elected in a landslide, where even his opponent doesn't vote for himself. The unanimous vote for him convinces Wallace that she is a witch. In disgust, Daniel strips his daughter of her magical powers, and vows to return her to the tree that imprisoned them.

In a panic, Jennifer interrupts Wallace's victory speech, imploring him to help her escape. Unfortunately, the taxi they get into to get away is driven by Daniel, who takes them in an airborne ride back to the tree. At the stroke of midnight, Wallace is left with Jennifer's lifeless body, while two plumes of smoke watch. Before they return to the tree, Jennifer asks to watch Wallace's torment. While Daniel gloats, Jennifer reclaims her body, explaining to Wallace, "Love is stronger than witchcraft." She quickly puts the top back on the bottle of liquor her father is hiding in, keeping him drunk and powerless. Years later, Wallace and Jennifer have children, and the housekeeper enters to complain about their youngest daughter, who enters pretending to ride a broom, to which Jennifer comments that "We're going to have trouble with that one."

Cast 

 Fredric March as Jonathan Wooley, Nathaniel Wooley, Samuel Wooley, and principally Wallace Wooley
 Veronica Lake as Jennifer Wooley
 Cecil Kellaway as Daniel
 Susan Hayward as Estelle Masterson
 Robert Benchley as Dr. Dudley White, Wooley's friend
 Elizabeth Patterson as Margaret, Wooley's housekeeper
 Eily Malyon as Tabitha Wooley
 Robert Warwick as J.B. Masterson
 Mary Field as Nancy Wooley
 Nora Cecil as Harriet Wooley
 Ann Carter as Jennifer Wooley
 Aldrich Bowker as Justice of the Peace
 Wade Boteler as Policeman (uncredited) 
 Robert Homans as Fire Chief (uncredited)

Cast notes:
 Preston Sturges served as producer on this film, until he left due to artistic differences with the director, and some regular members of his unofficial "stock company" of character actors appear in it, including Al Bridge, Chester Conklin, Florence Gill, Bess Flowers, Robert Greig, Esther Howard, Charles R. Moore, and Emory Parnell.

Production
The novel upon which the film is based was mainly written by Thorne Smith, who died in 1934. His papers included an unfinished novel entitled The Passionate Witch. Then three-quarters complete, its resolution was written by his friend Norman Matson and was published in July 1941. The book became a best seller.

I Married a Witch was produced by Paramount Pictures, and had the working title of He Married a Witch.  Director René Clair was looking for a new project after his first American film, The Flame of New Orleans (1941). His agent sent him a copy of The Passionate Witch.  Clair took it to Preston Sturges, then in favor at Paramount, who convinced Clair and the studio that it would be a good vehicle for Veronica Lake, with Sturges as producer. Paramount bought the film rights in October 1941. Dalton Trumbo was signed to write the script.

Robert Pirosh was called in to work on the script with Trumbo. Trumbo left the project after clashing with Sturges. Sturges himself left the film before it was completed due to artistic differences with director René Clair, and did not want to receive a screen credit.  Clair, who also contributed to the dialogue, apparently worked closely with writer Robert Pirosh.

Joel McCrea was originally announced to play the male lead in December 1941. However, by February in 1942, he withdrew from the project; he later said this was because he did not want to work with Veronica Lake again, after not getting along with her on Sullivan's Travels. McCrea's refusal to make the film caused production to be postponed. This enabled Lake to appear in The Glass Key (1942).

March and Lake also had problems, beginning with March's pre-production comment that Lake was "a brainless little blonde sexpot, void of any acting ability", to which Lake retaliated by calling March a "pompous poseur". Things did not get much better during filming, as Lake was prone to playing practical jokes on March, like hiding a 40-pound weight under her dress for a scene in which March had to carry her, or pushing her foot repeatedly into his groin during the filming of a from-the-waist-up shot. Patricia Morison was considered for the role of Estelle, and Walter Abel for Dudley.  Margaret Hayes was considered for the film as well, and was screentested.

Release
The film was one of a number of films sold by Paramount to United Artists in September, when UA did not have enough films to meet its commitments and Paramount had a surplus.  It was released by UA on October 30 that year.

At the time of the film's release, a film critic from The Chicago Tribune wrote, "I Married a Witch is bizarre but beguiling. Under Rene Clair's delicately preposterous direction it unreels a story of modern witchcraft, the like of which has not been seen on any screen." The reviewer also called Veronica Lake's performance "delightfully outrageous and very funny."

Diabolique agreed, eight decades later. "This is wickedly funny, an absolute delight – due greatly to Lake who was never more alluring, strutting around in men’s pajamas, casting spells, chasing after March and causing devilry. This was her only fantasy movie and it beggars belief that Paramount never tried her again in that genre – she had a vaguely ‘otherworld’ appearance (that hair, that voice) perfect for it."

The movie was released on VHS by Warner Home Video in the U.S. on July 18, 1990. The film was released on DVD and Blu-ray by The Criterion Collection in the U.S. on October 8, 2013.

Awards and honors
I Married a Witch was nominated for a 1943 Academy Award for "Best Music (Scoring of a Dramatic or Comedy Picture)" for composer Roy Webb.

References

External links

 
 
 
 
 I Married A Witch at Thorne Smith
 I Married a Witch at Trailers from Hell
 I Married a Witch: It’s Such an Ancient Pitch an essay by Guy Maddin at the Criterion Collection
 Review of film at Variety

1942 films
1940s fantasy comedy films
1942 romantic comedy films
American fantasy comedy films
American romantic comedy films
American romantic fantasy films
American black-and-white films
1940s English-language films
Films scored by Roy Webb
Films about curses
Films about reincarnation
Films based on American novels
Films based on fantasy novels
Films directed by René Clair
Paramount Pictures films
Salem witch trials in fiction
Films about witchcraft
1940s American films